K-Zone is a two-storey shopping mall complex in the vicinity of the Kapuwatta suburb area of Ja-Ela, outside Colombo, Sri Lanka. 

In 2011 John Keells Holdings acquired the  site on the Colombo-Negombo Road. The  building, was constructed at a cost of Rs 119 million, and is owned and operated by John Keells Holdings. It was opened to the public in October 2013.

References

Shopping malls in Sri Lanka